Blessing "YoGo-Yogo" Makunike (24 January 1977 – 13 March 2004) was a Zimbabwean international football player.

Club career
Blessing Makunike started his career in 1997 with Zimbabwe Premier Soccer League club CAPS United F.C., where he played until the end of the 2002 season. Together with his teammate, Leonard Tsipa, he then spent half a season with Serbian club FK Javor, where international Zimbabwean footballer Mike Temwanjera, together with other African players, helped them incorporate into the squad. However, he and Leonard went back to CAPS in the next summer, playing in the second semester of the 2003 Zimbabwean football season.

Car accident
On 13 March 2004, Blessing, together with two other players, Shingirai Alron and Gary Mashoko, and two supporters, burned to death when their car hit the pillar of the bridge and caught fire, the greatest loss of lives in a single incident in Zimbabwean football.

Honours
CAPS United
Zimbabwe Premier League (1): 2004
Zimbabwe Cup (3): 1997, 1998, 2004
Independence Trophy (1): 1997

International career
From 1998 to 2001 he played eight matches for the Zimbabwe national football team having scored one goal.

References

External sources

 
 
 Blessing Makunike at Srbijafudbal.

1977 births
2004 deaths
Sportspeople from Harare
Zimbabwean footballers
Zimbabwe international footballers
CAPS United players
FK Javor Ivanjica players
Expatriate footballers in Serbia
Association football defenders
Road incident deaths in Zimbabwe